Southdown railway station was a station at Southdown on the Southern Line of the Auckland suburban railway network. It was opened to passenger traffic in 1905 and was closed in 2004. It was double tracked and had an island platform layout. Pedestrian access was via a footbridge connecting the end of Southdown Lane to the Southdown Freezing Works.

Services were withdrawn by the Auckland Regional Transport Authority (ARTA) on 30 May 2004 due to low patronage and safety reasons.  In the years immediately preceding its closure, patronage had increased on Auckland suburban trains but Southdown had not followed the trend and passenger usage of the station had declined to only approximately forty people per weekday.  Safety concerns were raised due to the poor state of the footbridge used to access the platform, and the fact that to access the footbridge, passengers had to cross an unprotected freight siding.

See also 
List of Auckland railway stations

References 

Rail transport in Auckland
Defunct railway stations in New Zealand
Railway stations closed in 2004